Ted Dhanik is an American executive known for his roles at Myspace and other companies. At Myspace, Dhanik was a department VP and had helped launch the company when it was still in its infancy. He is also known for founding the technology company Engage:BDR, which went public in Australia in 2017.

He is also known for dating actress Tara Reid and contortionist, actress, and America's Got Talent contestant Marina Mazepa.

Education
Dhanik graduated from California State University, Hayward with a bachelor's degree.

Career
Dhanik has worked as a director at Xoriant. Other companies Dhanik has worked at include Atesto Technologies, Beyond, Brigade, and Merrill. Before joining Myspace, Dhanik developed a lending program at NexTag and also led development at LowerMyBills before it was bought up by Experian.

From 2003 to 2008, Dhanik was the VP of strategic marketing for Myspace. He was responsible for helping to start Myspace when it was still in its infancy, and for helping to develop many of the company's marketing strategies.

In 2009, Dhanik left Myspace to found Engage:BDR alongside Kurtis Rintala and Kenneth Kwan. Dhanik recruited Myspace founder Tom Anderson to serve on the board of Engage:BDR in 2017. Dhanik also developed IconicReach in 2009, which is a similar platform that focuses on matching popular Instagram users with companies. Dhanik has also advised companies such as LottoGopher, Fighter, and Schizo Pictures.

Publications
Dhanik has written articles for Ad Age, Fast Company, and others.

Personal life
In 2017, Dhanik dated actress Tara Reid. In 2019, Dhanik dated contortionist, actress, and America's Got Talent contestant Marina Mazepa.

Dhanik has various homes, including one in the West Hollywood Hills.

See also
Myspace
Tom Anderson

References

Living people
American technology company founders
American technology chief executives
American technology executives
Year of birth missing (living people)